The Saban Theatre is a historic theatre in Beverly Hills, California, formerly known as the Fox Wilshire Theater. It is an Art Deco structure at the southeast corner of Wilshire Boulevard and Hamilton Drive designed by architect S. Charles Lee and is considered a classic Los Angeles landmark.

Location

Located on Wilshire Boulevard, the exterior of the building with its simple Art Deco ornamentation is one of the first buildings seen by pedestrians and drivers entering the eastern boundary of the city of Beverly Hills.

History

The Saban Theatre has been both a significant cultural and architectural landmark for Los Angeles and Beverly Hills since its opening as the Fox Wilshire Theatre on September 19, 1930. It was originally designed with 2500 seats by noted theatre architect S. Charles Lee to be a major film presentation house, even including a stage for Vaudeville acts before the films.

Over its 91-year history, the Saban has been the site of numerous film premieres, exclusive first-run film engagements, live concerts and touring Broadway shows. Despite several renovations, the interior remains mostly intact with its columned two-story rotunda lobby, spacious orchestra and balcony level seating for 2,000, and its silver, gold and black proscenium and organ screens. The connection with architect S. Charles Lee, a long-time resident of the city of Beverly Hills, makes the Saban significant also as an example of Lee's transition from the French Regency style of the Tower Theatre and other Los Angeles Theatres to the nascent Art Deco style that would come to dominate movie palace architecture in the 1930s.

Opened as the Fox Wilshire Theatre, it was one of 20th Century Fox's premiere theaters for several decades, serving as a movie palace until a 1981 renovation converted it into a stage venue. It was operated by the Nederlander Organization from 1981 to 1989. The Saban Theater is now regularly used as a live performance venue for comedy, music, television, film shoots, screenings, and community intercultural events such as PaleyFest. Temple of the Arts has owned and operated the theatre since 2005. Sterling Venue Ventures, led by Lance Sterling currently produces over 50 concerts and events at the Saban per year. Notable performers Sterling has brought to the theatre include Marillion, Paul Anka, Burt Bacharach, Frankie Valli, Styx, George Thorogood, Kenny Loggins, Todd Rundgren, and Morris Day.

Renaming
In March 2009, owners announced that the Wilshire would be renamed the Saban Theatre in recognition of a $5 million grant from Haim and Cheryl Saban. The funds have been used to further restoration efforts on the orchestra, proscenium and marquee. It also houses programs by Temple of the Arts, which aims to integrate the arts and Judaism.

Preservation
Beverly Hills Performing Arts Center led the movement to have the city of Beverly Hills create a Historic Preservation Ordinance passing the Mills Act, which supports historic theatres. BHPAC secured placement of the venue on The Federal and State Registry of Historic Places and designation of the theatre as a Beverly Hills landmark.

Restoration
BHPAC'S mission was summarized as "Awakening a Sleeping Beauty," engaging design firm Evergreene Architectural Arts, which specializes in historic theatre restoration. Past evergreen projects include Radio City Music Hall, The Metropolitan Opera, Broadway's New Amsterdam Theatre, Hollywood's Pantages and Santa Barbara's Granada Theatre. They guided the restoration of the theatre orchestra and proscenium with the help of the archives of renowned theatre architect S. Charles Lee at the UCLA School of Architecture.

Modernization
In conjunction with Sterling Venue Ventures LLC, management began an extensive update of the stage, lighting, and sound systems so that performances of Broadway shows and live concerts could be enhanced. State of the art robotic cameras were also installed to capture live performance in high quality. Sterling Venue Ventures, in addition to updating the space, has also added special private event functionality to the venue to accommodate all types of special events up to 1,800 people.

The Steve Tisch Cinema Center
To reawaken the storied film history of the theatre, philanthropist film producer Steve Tisch gifted the naming rights for the Steve Tisch Cinema Center. This endowment enabled the installation of a state of the art film projection system as the theatre continues to host opening nights for major film festivals and special screenings.

Notable events
Notable events include:
 The African Queen starring Humphrey Bogart and Katharine Hepburn (December 26, 1951)
 How to Marry a Millionaire starring Marilyn Monroe and Lauren Bacall (November 1953)
 12 Angry Men starring Henry Fonda, Lee J. Cobb and Ed Begley (April 10, 1957) 
 Stevie Nicks's "White Winged Dove" tour (1981), filmed for an HBO special
 Los Angeles premiere of Paramount Pictures's Dreamgirls (December 11, 2006)
 Taping of the Season 1 finale episode "Journey" of the TV series Glee
 Comedy Central Roast of Alec Baldwin (September 15, 2019)

Since Sterling Venue Ventures took over management, the Saban has become a dominant force on the LA music scene.  Notable events include:
 'LA Comics Support Their Own' a special event featuring Ray Romano, Brian Regan, Bill Burr, and Bob Saget amongst many other Los Angeles-based comics.
 The 26th Annual NAACP Theatre Awards
 Star-Studded Tribute to Eddie Money with Sammy Hagar, George Thorogood, Kevin Cronin, James Hatfield, John Waite and more / February 20, 2020
 REO Speedwagon / February 4, 2020
 Styx / January 12, 2020 and January 19, 2019, and January 28, 2018
 Pat Benatar & Neil Giraldo / October 19, 2019
 David Crosby & Friends / September 10, 2019
 Art Garfunkel / May 9, 2019
 Little Steven & The Disciples of Soul with a special guest appearance by Bruce Springsteen / May 4, 2019
 Rick Springfield Accompanied by a Symphony Orchestra / March 30, 2019
 Frankie Valli & The Four Seasons February 28 and March 1, 2019
 Paul Anka / February 2, 2019 and January 14, 2018
 Todd Rundgren / December 31, 2017

Starlet disappearance (Folklore)
In May 1944, thirteen-year-old Patsy Ruth Brown disappeared after leaving producer Jack Schwarz's Fox Wilshire Building penthouse. Schwarz told juvenile officers that Patsy had spent the afternoon in his apartment. That evening he gave her three dollars for a taxi. According to Schwarz, Patsy left in the company of an older girl named O'Hara, whom Patsy had brought with her. Schwarz said that Patsy had begged him numerous times for a role in one of his films. Her only film appearance (uncredited) was in Nearly Eighteen (1943). A taxi driver who took Patsy to Union Station told the police that Patsy said she was going to San Bernardino to visit her father, an employee of a Barstow, California rock company. However, the taxi driver's tip failed to help police trace the missing girl.

Photo gallery

See also
National Register of Historic Places

References

External links

Saban Theatre on Twitter
BHPAC
Old Website

Buildings and structures in Beverly Hills, California
Theatres in Los Angeles County, California
Movie palaces
Wilshire Boulevard
Buildings and structures on the National Register of Historic Places in Los Angeles County, California
1930 establishments in California
Event venues established in 1930
Theatres completed in 1930
Art Deco architecture in California
Cinemas and movie theaters in Los Angeles County, California
Theatres on the National Register of Historic Places in California